Pa Sharkey  (1931 – 31 October 2016) was a member of the 1956 Irish Olympic boxing team, competing in the heavyweight division. He was eliminated in his 1st round fight - knock-out in the 3rd round - by the Swedish competitor Törner Åhsman.

References
Official Olympic Reports
International Olympic Committee results database
Patrick Sharkey's obituary

See also
Boxing at the 1956 Summer Olympics

1931 births
2016 deaths
Boxers at the 1956 Summer Olympics
Olympic boxers of Ireland
Irish male boxers
Heavyweight boxers